The 1929 Drake Bulldogs football team was an American football team that represented Drake University in the Missouri Valley Conference (MVC) during the 1929 college football season. In its ninth season under head coach Ossie Solem, the team compiled a 5–3–1 record (3–0–1 against MVC opponents), won the MVC championship, and outscored all opponents by a total of 145 to 79.

Key players included quarterback Lynn King and halfbacks Dick Nesbitt and Jack Barnes. Barnes was the team captain.

Schedule

References

Drake
Drake Bulldogs football seasons
Missouri Valley Conference football champion seasons
Drake Bulldogs football